Salix cordata, the sand dune willow, furry willow or heartleaf willow, is a perennial shrub that grows  tall; plants taller than  are rare. The plant is native to the northeast regions of the North American continent; it is found on sand dunes, river banks, and lake shores in sandy, silty or gravelly soils.

References

External links

cordata
Flora of Eastern Canada
Flora of the Northeastern United States
Flora of the Great Lakes region (North America)
Plants described in 1803
Taxa named by André Michaux
Flora without expected TNC conservation status